Cuoco is a surname derived from the Italian word that means "cook".

People bearing the name include:
Briana Cuoco, American singer and contestant in season 5 of The Voice
Francisco Cuoco (born 1933), Brazilian actor
Kaley Cuoco (born 1985), American actress (who, most notably, appears in The Big Bang Theory)
Andrew Cuoco (born 1984), System Administrator at Netwrix, cousin of Kaley Cuoco)
Vincenzo Cuoco (1770–1823), Italian writer

Occupational surnames
Italian-language surnames